Joanna of Flanders ( 1295 – September 1374) was Duchess of Brittany by her marriage to John of Montfort. Much of her life was taken up in defence of the rights of her husband and, later, son to the dukedom, which was challenged by the House of Blois during the War of the Breton Succession. Known for her fiery personality, Joanna led the Montfortist cause after her husband had been captured, and began the fight-back, showing considerable skill as a military leader.

Shortly after taking refuge in England, she was confined to Tickhill Castle by order of King Edward III.

Joanna was highly praised by the chronicler Jean Froissart for her courage and energy. Because of her feats of leadership, David Hume described her as "the most extraordinary woman of the age".

Life
Joanna was the daughter of Louis I, Count of Nevers and Joan, Countess of Rethel, and the sister of Louis I, Count of Flanders. She married John of Monfort in March 1329. John of Monfort claimed the title of Duke of Brittany, although his claim was contested by Joan of Penthièvre and her husband, Charles of Blois. Joanna and John had two children:
 John IV, Duke of Brittany (1339–1399) 
 Joan of Brittany, Baroness of Drayton (1341 – aft. 20 October 1399), born at the onset of the War of the Breton Succession, married before 21 October 1385 to Ralph Basset, 4th Baron Basset de Drayton

War of the Breton Succession
When John III, Duke of Brittany died childless in 1341, he left behind a contentious succession dispute. For many years he tried to find means to ensure that the children of his stepmother, Yolande of Dreux would not inherit the Duchy, including trying to have her marriage to his father annulled. At this time he declared his heir to be his niece Joan of Penthièvre. However he reconciled with his half brother, John of Monfort, shortly before his death, and indicated that he was to be the successor. Thus upon the death of Duke John III, there were two rival claimants for Brittany: the House of Montfort, led by John of Montfort and his wife Joanna, and the House of Blois led by Charles of Blois  and his wife Joan of Penthièvre.

John of Montfort went to Paris to be heard by King Philip VI of France. Philip was an uncle of Charles, and he imprisoned John, despite having given him a promise of safe conduct. Philip and the French courts then declared Joan and Charles to be the true heirs to the Duchy.

Joanna then announced her infant son as the leader of the Montfortist faction. She mustered an army and captured Redon. From there she went to Hennebont, to prepare it for a siege. Charles of Blois duly arrived in 1342 and besieged the town. She then sent Amaury de Clisson to ask King Edward III of England for aid. This, Edward was eager to give, since he had been claiming the French crown for himself, and was therefore at odds with Philip. If he could get Brittany as an ally, this would be of great advantage for future campaigns. He prepared ships under the command of Sir Walter Manny to relieve the siege.

Siege of Hennebont
In the siege of Hennebont, she took up arms and, dressed in armour, conducted the defence of the town, encouraging the people to fight, and urging the women to "cut their skirts and take their safety in their own hands". When she looked from a tower and saw that the enemy camp was almost unguarded, she led three hundred men on a charge, burned down Charles' supplies and destroyed his tents. After this she became known as "Jeanne la Flamme". When the Blois faction realised what was happening, they cut off her retreat to the town, but she and her knights rode to Brest, drawing a portion of the Blois force with them. Having secured Brest, she gathered together extra supporters and secretly returned to Hennebont, evading the Blois forces and re-entering the town with her reinforcements.

Charles of Blois tried to starve the people in Hennebont. During a long meeting the bishop of Leon tried to persuade Joanna to surrender, but from the window she saw Walter Manny's fleet from England sailing up. Hennebont was strengthened with the English forces and held out. Charles was forced to retreat, but tried to isolate Joanna by taking other towns in Brittany. On his return he again failed to capture Hennebont.

Fight back
Joanna sailed to England to seek further reinforcements from King Edward, which he provided, but the English fleet was intercepted on its way to Brittany by Charles of Blois' ally, Louis of Spain. In a hard-fought battle, the sailors and knights grappled in hand-to-hand combat as Louis' men attempted to board Joanna's ship. According to Froissart, Joanna fought in person "with the heart of a lion, and in her hand she wielded a sharp glaive, wherewith she fought fiercely". Eventually the English forces beat off Louis's ships and made harbour near Vannes. Her forces then captured Vannes, besieged Rennes and sought to break the siege of Hennebont.

From this point Joanna played little direct part in the fighting, as her faction was now being led by English warlords. With neither side able to achieve a decisive victory, by the truce of Malestroit in 1343, her husband John was released and hostilities ceased for a period. He was later imprisoned once again, but escaped and resumed the conflict. When her husband died in 1345 in the midst of the war, she again became the leader of the Montfort party to protect the rights of her son John V against the House of Blois. In 1347, English forces acting on her behalf captured Charles of Blois in battle.

Confinement
By this time Joanna and her son were living in England. In England, after being initially welcomed with honor, she was later confined by order of King Edward III and  spent the rest of her life in confinement at Tickhill Castle and elsewhere. King Edward III entrusted her to the care of Sir William Frank until 1346, Thomas Haukeston  (1346–57), John Delves (d. 1370) and finally to his widow Isabella and Godfrei Foljambe. Arthur de la Borderie attributed her confinement to mental illness, but more recent research finds no evidence she was insane. It is unlikely that "Warmer" (Warnier?) de Giston, assisted by his yeoman, would have risked gravely compromising himself by taking her out of the castle in 1347 and attempting to flee with her if she were mentally ill. Edward III probably imprisoned her in order to increase his own power in Brittany.

She lived long enough to see the final victory of her son John IV, Duke of Brittany over the House of Blois in 1364, but she never returned to the duchy. The last mention made of the duchess and her guardian is 14 February 1374. It seems she died that year.

Legacy

Joanna was later known as a prototype of the martial woman in Brittany, and a possible influence on Joan of Arc. Jean Froissart said she "had the courage of a man and the heart of a lion". David Hume described her as "the most extraordinary woman of the age". Victorian feminists also cited her as a role-model. Harriet Taylor Mill mentions her as one of the "heroic chatelaines" of the Middle Ages in her essay "The Enfranchisement of Women". Amelia Bloomer also cites her as one of the "heroic women" of the era. Pierce Butler said that she is "known to us, through the enthusiastic record of Froissart, as an amazon, but hardly known at all as a woman". He concluded,

In those qualities admired by chivalry she was unquestionably an extraordinary woman: courageous and personally valiant, with a head to plan daring exploits and a heart to conduct her through the thick of the danger; impulsive and generous, a free-handed ruler and an admirer of those deeds of chivalrous daring in others which she was so willing to share in herself ... One cannot read her story without enthusiasm, yet one would like to know more of the woman before bestowing unreserved praise on the countess "who was worth a man in a fight" and "who had the heart of a lion".

Joanna was later celebrated for her fiery exploits in Breton folklore, in particular in a ballad collected in Barzaz Breiz, which relates her attack on the camp at Hennebont. In Jeanne Coroller-Danio's Breton nationalist book Histoire de Notre Bretagne (1922), Joanna is depicted as a heroine of Breton resistance to French occupation.

See also

Timeline of women's participation in warfare
List of women warriors in folklore
List of wartime cross-dressers

References 

1295 births
1374 deaths
Women in 14th-century warfare
14th-century women rulers
Duchesses of Brittany
Regents of Brittany
Women in medieval European warfare
Women in war in France
Medieval French nobility
14th-century Breton people
People of the Hundred Years' War
14th-century French women